Gefion is an alternative spelling for Gefjon of Norse mythology. It may also refer to:

 Gefion Fountain, a fountain in Copenhagen, Denmark
 Gefion family, a grouping of asteroids in the intermediate main belt
  1272 Gefion, a main-belt asteroid
 SMS Gefion, a light cruiser of the Kaiserliche Marine